The 57th (West Middlesex) Regiment of Foot was a regiment of line infantry in the British Army, raised in 1755. Under the Childers Reforms it amalgamated with the 77th (East Middlesex) Regiment of Foot to form the Middlesex Regiment in 1881.

History

Early wars

The regiment was raised in Somerset and Gloucester by Colonel John Arabin as the 59th Regiment of Foot in 1755 for service in the Seven Years' War. It was re-ranked as the 57th Regiment of Foot, following the disbandment of the existing 50th and 51st regiments, in 1756. The regiment, which originally operated as marines, was deployed to Gibraltar in 1757, to Menorca in 1763 and to Ireland in 1767. 

It was dispatched to Charleston, South Carolina in February 1776 for service in the American Revolutionary War. The regiment saw action at the Battle of Long Island in August 1776 and stormed Fort Montgomery at the Battle of Forts Clinton and Montgomery in October 1777. The regiment's light company then served under General Lord Cornwallis and was taken prisoner at the Siege of Yorktown in October 1781. 

It adopted a county designation as the 57th (the West Middlesex) Regiment of Foot in August 1782. After this it moved to Nova Scotia in October 1783 and returned to England in November 1790.

Napoleonic Wars

In 1793 the regiment embarked for the Low Countries for service in the Flanders Campaign and re-enforced the garrison at Nieuwpoort for some months before returning home later in the year. The regiment returned to Flanders in 1794 before returning home again in 1795. It embarked for the West Indies in spring 1796 and took part in the capture of Saint Lucia in May 1796 before embarking for Trinidad in 1797 and returning home in 1803. A second battalion was raised in 1803 to increase the strength of the regiment but spent most of the war in Jersey. The 1st battalion embarked for the Mediterranean Sea in November 1805 and, after four years at Gibraltar, landed in Portugal for service in the Peninsular War in July 1809. The battalion fell back to the Lines of Torres Vedras in October 1810.

The battalion earned the regiment its nickname of "the Die Hards" after their participation in the Battle of Albuera, (order of battle) one of the bloodiest battles of the war, in May 1811. The commanding officer of the battalion, Colonel William Inglis, was struck down by a charge of canister shot which hit him in the neck and left breast. He refused to be carried to the rear for treatment, but lay in front of his men calling on them to hold their position and when the fight reached its fiercest cried, "Die hard the 57th, die hard!". The casualties of the battalion were 422 out of the 570 men in the ranks and 20 out of the 30 officers. The Allied commander of the Anglo-Portuguese force General William Beresford wrote in his dispatch, "our dead, particularly the 57th Regiment, were lying as they fought in the ranks, every wound in front".

The battalion also fought at the Battle of Vitoria in June 1813. It then pursued the French Army into France and saw further action at the Battle of the Pyrenees in July 1813, the Battle of Nivelle in November 1813 and the Battle of the Nive in December 1813. The battalion embarked for North America in May 1814 for service in the War of 1812 but, without seeing any action, it embarked for home in spring 1815.

The Victorian era

The regiment traveled to New South Wales in detachments as escorts to prisoners in 1824. It moved on to India in 1830 and, while there, helped to suppress a rebellion in Mangalore in 1837. The regiment did not embark for home until April 1846. In September 1854 the regiment embarked for service in the Crimean War: it fought at the Battle of Inkerman in November 1854 and the Siege of Sevastapol in winter 1854. It moved to Malta in June 1856 and then sailed for India to help suppress the Indian Rebellion in May 1858. It then sailed for Auckland in New Zealand in November 1860 for service in the New Zealand Wars. Ensign John Thornton Down and Drummer Dudley Stagpoole were both awarded the Victoria Cross for their actions during a skirmish at Allen's Hill near Omata in October 1863 during the Second Taranaki War. The regiment returned to England in 1867 and then moved to Ceylon in 1873. From Ceylon it sailed to South Africa in 1879 for service in the Anglo-Zulu War.

As part of the Cardwell Reforms of the 1870s, where single-battalion regiments were linked together to share a single depot and recruiting district in the United Kingdom, the 57th was linked with the 77th (East Middlesex) Regiment of Foot, and assigned to district no. 50 at Hounslow Barracks. On 1 July 1881 the Childers Reforms came into effect and the regiment amalgamated with the 77th (East Middlesex) Regiment of Foot to form the Middlesex Regiment.

Regimental marches
The regiment's regimental marches were 'Sir Manley Power' (quick) and 'Caledonian' (slow).

Victoria Cross
 Ensign John Thornton Down, New Zealand Wars (2 October 1863)
 Sergeant George Gardiner, Crimean War (22 March 1855)
 Private Charles McCorrie, Crimean War (23 June 1855)
 Drummer Dudley Stagpoole, New Zealand Land Wars (2 October 1863)

Battle honours
The regiment's battle honours were as follows:
 Peninsular War: Albuhera, Vittoria, Pyrenees, Nivelle, Nive, Peninsula
 Crimean War: Inkerman, Sevastapol
 Later wars: New Zealand, South Africa (1879)

Colonels of the Regiment
Colonels of the Regiment were:

59th Regiment of Foot
1755–1757 Col. John Arabin

57th Regiment of Foot
1757–1767 Lt-Gen. Sir David Cunynghame
1767–1780 Gen. Sir John Irwin
1780–1806 Gen. John Campbell (of Strachur)

57th (the West Middlesex) Regiment of Foot
1806–1811 Gen. John Hely-Hutchinson, 2nd Earl of Donoughmore
1811–1830 Gen. Sir Hew Whitefoord Dalrymple, Bt.
1830–1835 Lt-Gen. Sir William Inglis
1835–1843 Gen. Sir Frederick Adam
1843–1856 F.M. Sir Henry Hardinge, 1st Viscount Hardinge
1856–1865 Gen. Sir James Frederick Love
1865–1873 Gen. Charles Richard Fox
1873–1875 Gen. Freeman Murray
1875–1881 Gen. Sir Edward Alan Holdich

See also
Edwin Bezar – last surviving member

References

Sources

57
1755 establishments in Great Britain
1881 disestablishments in the United Kingdom
Regiments of the British Army in the Crimean War
Regiments of the British Army in the American Revolutionary War
Military units and formations established in 1755
Military units and formations disestablished in 1881
Middlesex Regiment
Military units and formations in Middlesex
Military units and formations of the United Kingdom in the Peninsular War